Razumov is an impact crater on the far side of the Moon, beyond the northwestern limb as seen from the Earth. It lies along the southeastern outer rim of the walled plain Landau. Intruding slightly into the southern rim is the slightly smaller crater Petropavlovskiy. To the west-southwest lies Frost.

This crater has a worn outer rim, with a small crater along the northwestern rim and outward bulges to the north-northeast and east-southeast. The interior floor has a small crater in the western half and small craterlets along the western and southern edges. It is otherwise marked only by a few tiny craterlets.

Satellite craters
By convention these features are identified on lunar maps by placing the letter on the side of the crater midpoint that is closest to Razumov.

References

 
 
 
 
 
 
 
 
 
 
 
 

Impact craters on the Moon